The Bani Utbah (plural Utub;  , singular Utbi) is an Arab tribal confederation that originated in Najd. The confederation is thought to have been formed when a group of Arab clans migrated to Eastern Arabia from Najd in the 16th century. Bani Utbah belongs to the larger Anizah tribe. The Al Bin Ali along with current ruling families of Bahrain and Kuwait were the rulers of the federation. The name of confederation is found in the form Attoobee or Uttoobee in English sources up to the late 19th century.

History

Invasion of Oman (1697) 
The Shia Iranian Safavids asked for the assistance of the Utub in invading Oman in 1697; however, they were defeated, as they were already engaged in another war with the Ottomans for the control of Basra. Some Utub and Huwala at that time were serving as mariners in the Persian navy, but they revolted of maltreatment and took possession of some ships and drove away.

Omani invasion of Bahrain (1717) 

The sultan of Oman at the time, Sultan bin Saif II, asked for the assistance of the Utub in invading Bahrain in 1717. The Utub assisted him and he successfully took Bahrain from the Safavids, Qishm and other Islands near the Persian coast.

Bani Utbah invasion of Bahrain (1783) 

Bani Utbah led by many clans along with Ahmed ibn Muhammad ibn Khalifa and Salama bin Saif Al Bin Ali invaded and conquered Bahrain in 1783. Bahrain is ruled by the Bani Utbah House of Khalifa ever since.

On 17 May 1783, war broke out between the Al Bin Ali clan and the army of Nasr Al-Madhkur. Zubarah was originally the center of power of the Al Bin Ali Bani Utbah clan, which ruled Zubarah and are the original dominant clan in Zubarah. About 2,000 Persian troops arrived in Bahrain by December; they then attacked Zubarah on 17 May 1783. After suffering a defeat, the Persians withdrew their arms and retreated to their ships. An Utub naval fleet from Kuwait arrived in Bahrain the same day and set Manama ablaze. The Persian forces returned to the mainland to recruit troops for another attack, but their garrisons in Bahrain were ultimately overrun by the Utub.

It is well known that the strategist of this battle was Shaikh Nasr Al-Madhkur; his sword fell into the hands of Salama Bin Saif Al Bin Ali after his army collapsed and his forces were defeated.

The Utub under the leadership of Shaikh Ahmad bin Mohammed Al Khalifa and his subjects in Zubarah, Qatar, conquered and expelled the Persians from Bahrain after defeating them in the battle of Zubarah that took place in the year 1782 between the people of Zubarah and the Army of Nasr Al-Madhkur Ruler of Bahrain and Bushire. The Bani Utbah was already present at Bahrain at that time, settling there during summer season and purchasing date palm gardens.

Conquest of Mombasa (1837) 
On 5 March 1837, the Al Bin Ali under the command of their leader Isa bin Tarif attacked Mombasa, Said bin Sultan, Sultan of Muscat and Oman helped the Ali Bin Ali with ships and armoury, repeatedly bombarding Fort Jesus for a week until the Portuguese surrendered on 12 March. The fort was ruled by the Portuguese Empire, with East African and Portuguese soldiers.[4]

Fort Jesus is a Portuguese fort built in 1593 by order of King Philip II of Spain (King Philip I of Portugal), then ruler of the joint Portuguese and Spanish Kingdoms, located on Mombasa Island to guard the Old Port of Mombasa, Kenya. It was built in the shape of a man (viewed from the air), and was given the name of Jesus, after Shaikh Isa Bin Tarif Al Bin Ali Al Utbi conquered the fort in 1837.

Migration
The Utub's ancestors were expelled from Umm Qasr in Iraq by the Ottomans due to their predatory habits of preying on caravans in Basra and trading ships in Shatt al-Arab. They migrated to Kuwait thereafter and established a government under Al-Sabah family. Around the 1760s, the Al Jalahma and Al Khalifa clans, both belonging to the Utub federation, migrated to Zubarah in modern-day Qatar, leaving Al Sabah as the sole proprietors of Kuwait. The two clans established a free-trade port at Zubarah's harbor, but the Al Khalifas refused to share the economic gains with the Al Jalahmah, and so the latter migrated to Al Ruwais. The Al Khalifa went on to monopolize the pearl banks around Qatar.

Putting aside their grievances, the Utub clans of Al Bin Ali, Al Jalahma and Al Khalifa, along with some Arab clans, drove out the Persians from Bahrain in 1783 in an expedition which was launched in part due to Persian aggression towards Zubarah in 1782.

See also
 Huwala

References

History of Eastern Arabia
Kuwaiti families
Bahraini families
Arab groups